Hoyle Puzzle Games 2005 is a 2005 puzzle video game published by Sierra Entertainment. Hoyle Puzzle Games 2005 was released in the us on January 1, 2005.

Overview
Holy Puzzle Games 2005 includes the following puzzle games:
 Panic (based on Tetris, with three different modes)
 Rays
 Maze Racer
 Maze Raider
 Placer Racer
 Time Breaker
 Mahjong Tiles
 The Incredible Machine: Even More Contraptions

References

External links
 Hoyle Puzzle Games 2005 on GameSpot
 Maze Racers on Foxmind

Puzzle video games
Sierra Entertainment games
2005 video games
Windows games
Windows-only games
Video games developed in the United States